The Chevalier de Brun de Boades ( — 7 September 1781 ) was a French Navy officer. He served in the War of American Independence.

Biography 
Brun de Boades was born to the family of a Council of the Parliament of Provence. His uncle, Jean de Brun de Boades, also served in the Navy, reaching the rank of Chef d'Escadre. Boades joined the Navy as Garde-Marine on 2 April 1748, and was promoted to Lieutenant on 15 January 1762.  

He was promoted to Captain on 4 April 1777. In 1778, he captained the frigate Magicienne. 

In 1780, Boades captained the 64-gun Triton in the squadron under Guichen. He died on 7 September 1781 of wounds sustained at the Battle of the Chesapeake.

Sources and references 
 Notes

Citations

Bibliography
 
 
 
 

External links
 

French Navy officers
French military personnel of the American Revolutionary War